Tana may be:

One of the South Vanuatu languages
Tana language (South Sudan)